The Ucea–Victoria railway line is a Romanian  standard gauge single-track railway branching from Ucea railway station on CFR line 200, at  above sea, and heading South towards Victoria city, at  above sea.

It is currently used only for freight transport by Viromet S.A. in Victoria.

History

The birth and development of the railway was closely linked to that of Ucea (later Victoria) Chemical Plant. As a preliminary work, by Decree-Law nr. 3456 from 20 September 1939, the Armament Endowment Ministry was allowed to lend CFR 90 million lei for repairing and strengthening the railway between Podu Olt and Ucea in order for it to sustain heavier traffic.

The birth certificate of the line was Decree-Law nr. 3667 from 7 October 1939, allowing the construction of a new railway line for Ucea-Fabrică in Făgăraș County. Thus, CFR was to build the line from Ucea de Jos to Ucea-Fabrică on behalf of the Armament Endowment Ministry. Every religious, art or charity institute on the way was allowed and encouraged to make available any necessary land. One month later, by Royal Decree 3991 from 7 November 1939, the line was declared public utility in the interest of national defense. Any expropriation necessary was expedited while at the same time any property of the State, Land or Commune on the way was to be ceded for free.

By the end of 1939 the line was operational, with the following characteristics:
 37,500 m³ of embankments and track ballast; 15 small bridges, totaling 
 3 stations with station buildings for passengers (Ucea de Jos, Ucea de Sus, Ucea Fabrică); 5 section houses
 telephone line and signalling equipment
 build at a cost of approximately 5,750,000 lei/km

Until 1951 it held only freight traffic. In 1950–1951, the tracks were replaced with 40 kg/m rails.

By the Order 573/100 of Ministry of Transportation from 31 May 1951, from 1 June 1951 the line was officially opened for passenger traffic between Ucea and Ucea Fabrică, as line 39 bis in the timetable, with the following stops:
For passengers, there were 4 pairs of mixed trains, increased to 5 in the following years and then reduced to 3 in 1956 and just 2 by 1959–60. All trains usually had a number of freight wagons, sometimes followed by 2 passenger wagons, and they were pulled by steam locomotives (CFR 326 series from 1939 to 1954, CFR 50.000 series from 1954 to 1966) or diesel locomotives (CFR LDM 20.000 series from 1940 to 1966, CFR DA 060 series and others after 1966).

Between 1952 and 1953, a new station, named Ucea (haltă), was built to the South of Colonia Ucea (future Victoria city), at kilometer 8.978. In 1953-54 Ucea Colonie station was reduced to a single track and the line between Ucea Colonie and Ucea Fabrică was dismantled, the latter station being closed. Thus, after passing Ucea Colonie, the trains entered Ucea (haltă) and with a pinched loop operation continued their way to the factory, on the old line, connected with Ucea (haltă) at kilometer 8.4.

At the same time, Ucea Fabrică station was closed. Thus, the new stops on the Ucea–Victoria railway line were:

In 1960 all passenger traffic on the line has ceased, being taken over by a bus line. All intermediary stations between Ucea and Victoria were closed. In 1962 the line was renumbered as 225.

In 1969 the tracks were replaced with 49 kg/m rails, fixed on new concrete sleepers.

Description

Freight traffic continues to this day on this line. In Ucea station, the line to Victoria branches from track 2, with track 1 as siding. After crossing DN1, the line heads South, by the side of DJ105C, to Victoria station where it enters on the main track 3. Tracks 1 and 2 are sidings in connection to Ucea, while track 4 heads only to the Chemical Plant (which is possible from the first three tracks as well). All switches in Victoria station are hand-operated.

References

Bibliography

External links
 Dashcam video of the entire line from Victoria to Ucea

Industrial railways in Romania
Standard gauge railways in Romania
Railway lines opened in 1939